Johannes Musæus Norman (1823–1903) was a Norwegian botanist, trained as a doctor.

Norman was the son of a priest, took artium in 1840 and graduated in medicine in 1847. After a short time as a military doctor in the First Schleswig War, he worked 1849–1857 exclusively with botany. Partly on exploration trips in Gudbrandsdalen, in Western Norway and in Western Finnmark; partly during further education in Paris and Vienna and partly as a research fellow at  University of Oslo. He also completed this chapter of his life, and trained as forester in 1858–1860, in Aschaffenburg, Bavaria. Upon his return, he was appointed Forester in Troms and Finnmark, a position he held during 1860–1876. He is credited for introducing the lichen term  in an 1872 publication.

References

19th-century Norwegian botanists
1823 births
1903 deaths